Icon is a compilation album by American country music artist Gary Allan. It was released on March 6, 2012. It is part of a series of similar Icon albums released by Universal Music Enterprises.

Track listing

Critical reception

Steve Leggett of Allmusic notes the album is "a great introduction to a woefully unsung American artist."

Charts
Icon debuted at number 29 on the U.S. Billboard Top Country Albums chart and number 200 on the Billboard 200.

References

2012 compilation albums
Gary Allan albums
MCA Records compilation albums